Wanféré is a village in the Doulougou Department of Bazèga Province in central Burkina Faso. The village has a population of 290.

References

Populated places in the Centre-Sud Region
Bazèga Province